Allah is the common Arabic word for God. In the English language, the word generally refers to God in Islam. The word is thought to be derived by contraction from al-ilāh, which means "the god", and is linguistically related to the  Aramaic words Elah and Syriac  (ʼAlāhā) and the Hebrew word El (Elohim) for God.

The word Allah has been used by Arabic people of different religions since pre-Islamic times. The pre-Islamic Arabs worshipped a supreme deity whom they called Allah, alongside other lesser deities. Muhammad used the word Allah to indicate the Islamic conception of God. Allah has been used as a term for God by Muslims (both Arab and non-Arab) and even Arab Christians after the term "al-ilāh" and "Allah" were used interchangeably in Classical Arabic by the majority of Arabs who had become Muslims. It is also often, albeit not exclusively, used in this way by Bábists, Baháʼís, Mandaeans, Indonesian and Maltese Christians, and Sephardi Jews, as well as by the Gagauz people. Similar usage by Christians and Sikhs in West Malaysia has recently led to political and legal controversies.

Etymology

The etymology of the word Allāh has been discussed extensively by classical Arab philologists.  Grammarians of the Basra school regarded it as either formed "spontaneously" (murtajal) or as the definite form of lāh (from the verbal root lyh with the meaning of "lofty" or "hidden"). Others held that it was borrowed from Syriac or Hebrew, but most considered it to be derived from a contraction of the Arabic definite article al- "the" and  "deity, god" to  meaning "the deity", or "the God". The majority of modern scholars subscribe to the latter theory, and view the loanword hypothesis with skepticism.

Cognates of the name "Allāh" exist in other Semitic languages, including Hebrew and Aramaic.

History of usage

Pre-Islamic Arabians

Regional variants of the word Allah occur in both pagan and Christian pre-Islamic inscriptions. Different theories have been proposed regarding the role of Allah in pre-Islamic polytheistic cults.  According to the Islamic scholar Ibn Kathir, Arab pagans considered Allah as an unseen God who created and controlled the Universe. Pagans believed worship of humans or animals who had lucky events in their life brought them closer to God. Pre-Islamic Meccans worshiped Allah alongside a host of lesser gods and those whom they called the "daughters of Allah." Islam forbade worship of anyone or thing other than God. Some authors have suggested that polytheistic Arabs used the name as a reference to a creator god or a supreme deity of their pantheon. The term may have been vague in the Meccan religion. According to one hypothesis, which goes back to Julius Wellhausen, Allah (the supreme deity of the tribal federation around Quraysh) was a designation that consecrated the superiority of Hubal (the supreme deity of Quraysh) over the other gods. However, there is also evidence that Allah and Hubal were two distinct deities. According to that hypothesis, the Kaaba was first consecrated to a supreme deity named Allah and then hosted the pantheon of Quraysh after their conquest of Mecca, about a century before the time of Muhammad. Some inscriptions seem to indicate the use of Allah as a name of a polytheist deity centuries earlier, but nothing precise is known about this use. Some scholars have suggested that Allah may have represented a remote creator god who was gradually eclipsed by more particularized local deities. There is disagreement on whether Allah played a major role in the Meccan religious cult. No iconic representation of Allah is known to have existed. Allah is the only god in Mecca that did not have an idol. Muhammad's father's name was  meaning "the slave of Allāh".

Islam

In Islam, Allah is the unique, omnipotent and only deity and creator of the universe and is equivalent to God in other Abrahamic religions. Allah is usually seen as the personal name of God, a notion which became disputed in contemporary scholarship, including the question, whether or not the word Allah should be translated as God.

According to Islamic belief, Allah is the most common word to represent God, and humble submission to his will, divine ordinances and commandments is the pivot of the Muslim faith. "He is the only God, creator of the universe, and the judge of humankind." "He is unique and inherently one, all-merciful and omnipotent."      No human eyes can see Allah till the Day Of Judgement. The Qur'an declares "the reality of Allah, His inaccessible mystery, His various names, and His actions on behalf of His creatures." Allah doesn't depend on anything. God is not a part of the Christian Trinity. God has no parents and no children.

The concept correlates to the Tawhid, where chapter 112 of the Qur'an (Al-'Ikhlās, The Sincerity) reads:۝ SAY, God is one GOD;
۝ the eternal GOD:
۝  He begetteth not, neither is He begotten:
۝ and there is not any one like unto Him.and in the Ayat ul-Kursi ("Verse of the Throne"), which is the 255th verse and the powerful verse in the longest chapter (the 2nd chapter) of the Qur'an, Al-Baqarah ("The Cow") states:

Allah! There is no deity but Him, the Alive, the Eternal.
Neither slumber nor sleep overtaketh Him.

Unto Him belongeth whatsoever is in the heavens and whatsoever is in the earth.
Who could intercede in His presence without His permission?

He knoweth that which is in front of them and that which is behind them,
while they encompass nothing of His knowledge except what He wills.

His throne includeth the heavens and the earth,
and He is never weary of preserving them.

He is the Sublime, the Tremendous.

In Islamic tradition, there are 99 Names of God ( lit. meaning: 'the best names' or 'the most beautiful names'), each of which evoke a distinct characteristic of Allah. All these names refer to Allah, the supreme and all-comprehensive divine name. Among the 99 names of God, the most famous and most frequent of these names are "the Merciful" (ar-Raḥmān) and "the Compassionate", including the forementioned above al-Aḥad ("the One, the Indivisible") and al-Wāḥid ("the Unique, the Single").

Most Muslims use the untranslated Arabic phrase  (meaning 'if God wills') after references to future events. There are certain phrases in praise of God that are favored by Muslims, including "" (Glory be to God), "" (Praise be to God), "" (There is no deity but God) or sometimes "lā ilāha illā inta/ huwa" (There is no deity but You/ Him) and "" (God is the Most Great) as a devotional exercise of remembering God (dhikr).

In a Sufi practice known as dhikr Allah (Arabic: ذكر الله, lit. "Remembrance of God"), the Sufi repeats and contemplates the name Allah or other associated divine names to Him while controlling his or her breath. For example, in countless references in the context from the Qur'an forementioned above:

 Allah is referred to in the second person pronoun in Arabic as "Inta (Arabic: َإِنْت)" like the English "You", or commonly in the third person pronoun "Huwa (Arabic: َهُو)" like the English "He" and uniquely in the case pronoun of the oblique form "Hu/ Huw (Arabic: هو /-هُ)" like the English "Him" which rhythmically resonates and is chanted as considered a sacred sound or echo referring Allah as the "Absolute Breath or Soul of Life"—Al-Nafs al-Hayyah (Arabic: النّفس الحياة, an-Nafsu 'l-Ḥayyah)—notably among the 99 names of God, "the Giver of Life" (al-Muḥyī) and "the Bringer of Death" (al-Mumiyt);
 Allah is neither male or female (who has no gender), but who is the essence of the "Omnipotent, Selfless, Absolute Soul (an-Nafs, النّفس) and Holy Spirit" (ar-Rūḥ, الرّوح) - notably among the 99 names of God, "the All-Holy, All-Pure and All-Sacred" (al-Quddus);
 Allah is the originator of both before and beyond the cycle of creation, destruction and time, - notably among the 99 names of God, "the First, Beginning-less" (al-Awwal), "the End/ Beyond ["the Final Abode"]/ Endless" (al-Akhir/ al-Ākhir) and "the Timeless" (aṣ-Ṣabūr).

According to Gerhard Böwering, in contrast with pre-Islamic Arabian polytheism, God in Islam does not have associates and companions, nor is there any kinship between God and jinn. Pre-Islamic pagan Arabs believed in a blind, powerful, inexorable and insensible fate over which man had no control. This was replaced with the Islamic notion of a powerful but provident and merciful God.

According to Francis Edward Peters, "The Qur’ān insists, Muslims believe, and historians affirm that Muhammad and his followers worship the same God as the Jews. The Qur’an's Allah is the same Creator God who covenanted with Abraham". Peters states that the Qur'an portrays Allah as both more powerful and more remote than Yahweh, and as a universal deity, unlike Yahweh who closely follows Israelites.

Christianity
The Christian Arabs of today have no other word for "God" than "Allah". Similarly, the Aramaic word for "God" in the language of Assyrian Christians is ʼĔlāhā, or Alaha. (Even the Arabic-descended Maltese language of Malta, whose population is almost entirely Catholic, uses Alla for "God".) (See God in Christianity for the Christian concept of God.)

Arab Christians have used two forms of invocations that were affixed to the beginning of their written works. They adopted the Muslim , and also created their own Trinitized  as early as the 8th century. The Muslim  reads: "In the name of God, the Compassionate, the Merciful." The Trinitized  reads: "In the name of Father and the Son and the Holy Spirit, One God." The Syriac, Latin and Greek invocations do not have the words "One God" at the end. This addition was made to emphasize the monotheistic aspect of Trinitarian belief and also to make it more palatable to Muslims.

According to Marshall Hodgson, it seems that in the pre-Islamic times, some Arab Christians made pilgrimage to the Kaaba, a pagan temple at that time, honoring Allah there as God the Creator.

Some archaeological excavation quests have led to the discovery of ancient pre-Islamic inscriptions and tombs made by Arab Christians in the ruins of a church at Umm el-Jimal in Northern Jordan, which initially, according to Enno Littman (1949), contained references to Allah as the proper name of God. However, on a second revision by Bellamy et al. (1985 & 1988) the 5-versed-inscription was re-translated as "(1)This [inscription] was set up by colleagues of ʿUlayh, (2) son of ʿUbaydah, secretary (3) of the cohort Augusta Secunda (4) Philadelphiana; may he go mad who (5) effaces it."

The syriac word ܐܠܗܐ (ʼĔlāhā) can be found in the reports and the lists of names of Christian martyrs in South Arabia, as reported by antique Syriac documents of the names of those martyrs from the era of the Himyarite and Aksumite kingdoms

In Ibn Ishaq's biography there is a Christian leader named Abd Allah ibn Abu Bakr ibn Muhammad, who was martyred in Najran in 523, as he had worn a ring that said "Allah is my lord".

In an inscription of Christian martyrion dated back to 512, references to 'l-ilah (الاله) can be found in both Arabic and Aramaic. The inscription starts with the statement "By the Help of 'l-ilah".

In pre-Islamic Gospels, the name used for God was "Allah", as evidenced by some discovered Arabic versions of the New Testament written by Arab Christians during the pre-Islamic era in Northern and Southern Arabia. However most recent research in the field of Islamic Studies by Sydney Griffith et al. (2013), David D. Grafton (2014), Clair Wilde (2014) & ML Hjälm et al. (2016 & 2017) assert that "all one can say about the possibility of a pre-Islamic, Christian version of the Gospel in Arabic is that no sure sign of its actual existence has yet emerged." Additionally ML Hjälm in her most recent research (2017) inserts that "manuscripts containing translations of the gospels are encountered no earlier than the year 873"

Irfan Shahîd quoting the 10th-century encyclopedic collection Kitab al-Aghani notes that pre-Islamic Arab Christians have been reported to have raised the battle cry "Ya La Ibad Allah" (O slaves of Allah) to invoke each other into battle. According to Shahid, on the authority of 10th-century Muslim scholar Al-Marzubani, "Allah" was also mentioned in pre-Islamic Christian poems by some Ghassanid and Tanukhid poets in Syria and Northern Arabia.

Pronunciation

The word Allāh is generally pronounced , exhibiting a heavy lām, a velarized alveolar lateral approximant, a marginal phoneme in Modern Standard Arabic. Since the initial alef has no hamza, the initial  is elided when a preceding word ends in a vowel.

As a loanword

English and other European languages
The history of the name Allāh in English was probably influenced by the study of comparative religion in the 19th century; for example, Thomas Carlyle (1840) sometimes used the term Allah but without any implication that Allah was anything different from God. However, in his biography of Muḥammad (1934), Tor Andræ always used the term Allah, though he allows that this "conception of God" seems to imply that it is different from that of the Jewish and Christian theologies.

Languages which may not commonly use the term Allah to denote God may still contain popular expressions which use the word. For example, because of the centuries long Muslim presence in the Iberian Peninsula, the word ojalá in the Spanish language and oxalá in the Portuguese language exist today, borrowed from Arabic inshalla (Arabic: إِنْ شَاءَ ٱللَّٰهُ). This phrase literally means 'if God wills' (in the sense of "I hope so"). The German poet Mahlmann used the form "Allah" as the title of a poem about the ultimate deity, though it is unclear how much Islamic thought he intended to convey.

Some Muslims leave the name "Allāh" untranslated in English, rather than using the English translation "God". The word has also been applied to certain living human beings as personifications of the term and concept.

Malaysian and Indonesian language

Christians in Malaysia and Indonesia use Allah to refer to God in the Malaysian and Indonesian languages (both of them standardized forms of the Malay language).  Mainstream Bible translations in the language use Allah as the translation of Hebrew Elohim (translated in English Bibles as "God"). This goes back to early translation work by Francis Xavier in the 16th century. The first dictionary of Dutch-Malay by Albert Cornelius Ruyl, Justus Heurnius, and Caspar Wiltens in 1650 (revised edition from 1623 edition and 1631 Latin edition) recorded "Allah" as the translation of the Dutch word "Godt". Ruyl also translated the Gospel of Matthew in 1612 into the Malay language (an early Bible translation into a non-European language,
made a year after the publication of the King James Version), which was printed in the Netherlands in 1629. Then he translated the Gospel of Mark, published in 1638.

The government of Malaysia in 2007 outlawed usage of the term Allah in any other but Muslim contexts, but the Malayan High Court in 2009 revoked the law, ruling it unconstitutional. While Allah had been used for the Christian God in Malay for more than four centuries, the contemporary controversy was triggered by usage of Allah by the Roman Catholic newspaper The Herald. The government appealed the court ruling, and the High Court suspended implementation of its verdict until the hearing of the appeal. In October 2013 the court ruled in favor of the government's ban. In early 2014 the Malaysian government confiscated more than 300 bibles for using the word to refer to the Christian God in Peninsular Malaysia. However, the use of Allah is not prohibited in the two Malaysian states of Sabah and Sarawak. The main reason it is not prohibited in these two states is that usage has been long-established and local Alkitab (Bibles) have been widely distributed freely in East Malaysia without restrictions for years. Both states also do not have similar Islamic state laws as those in West Malaysia.

In reaction to some media criticism, the Malaysian government has introduced a "10-point solution" to avoid confusion and misleading information. The 10-point solution is in line with the spirit of the 18- and 20-point agreements of Sarawak and Sabah.

National flags with "Allah" written on them

Typography

This is because the spelling was settled before Arabic spelling started habitually using  to spell .

In the pre-Islamic Zabad inscription, God is referred to by the term , that is, alif-lam-alif-lam-ha. This presumably indicates Al-'ilāh = "the god", without alif for ā.

Many Arabic type fonts feature special ligatures for Allah.

Since Arabic script is used to write other texts rather than Koran only, rendering  +  +  as the previous ligature is considered faulty which is the case with most common Arabic typefaces.

Unicode
Instead, the word  should be represented by its individual Arabic letters, while modern font technologies will render the desired ligature.

The calligraphic variant of the word used as the emblem of Iran is encoded in Unicode, in the Miscellaneous Symbols range, at code point U+262B (☫).

See also
 Abdullah (name)
 Allah as a lunar deity
 Emblem of Iran
 Ismul Azam
 Names of God

Citations

General and cited references 
 The Unicode Consortium, Unicode Standard 5.0, Addison-Wesley, 2006, About the Unicode Standard Version 5.0 Book

Further reading

Online 
 Allah Qur'ān, in Encyclopædia Britannica Online, by Asma Afsaruddin, Brian Duignan, Thinley

External links

 Names of Allah with Meaning on Website, Flash, and Mobile Phone Software
 Concept of God (Allah) in Islam
 The Concept of Allāh According to the Qur'an by Abdul Mannan Omar
 Allah, the Unique Name of God

 Typography
 Arabic Fonts and Mac OS X
 Programs for Arabic in Mac OS X

 
Arabian deities
Arabian gods
Islamic terminology
Middle Eastern gods
Names of God